Murray McLachlan (born 19 January 1941) is a South African former swimmer. He competed in two events at the 1960 Summer Olympics. At the 1958 British Empire and Commonwealth Games McLachlan competed in the 110 yards freestyle not progressing past the heats.

References

External links

1941 births
Living people
South African male swimmers
Olympic swimmers of South Africa
Swimmers at the 1960 Summer Olympics
Swimmers at the 1958 British Empire and Commonwealth Games
Universiade medalists in swimming
Swimmers from Johannesburg
Commonwealth Games medallists in swimming
Commonwealth Games bronze medallists for South Africa
Universiade gold medalists for South Africa
Medalists at the 1961 Summer Universiade
Medalists at the 1963 Summer Universiade
21st-century South African people
20th-century South African people
Medallists at the 1958 British Empire and Commonwealth Games